Noelene Mary Raffills is a New Zealand politician who was an Auckland Councillor.

Political career

Between 2000 and 2010 she was a councillor on the Auckland City Council.

In the 2010 Auckland Council elections Raffills won the seat in the Whau ward. She was defeated by Ross Clow in the 2013 Auckland Council elections.

References

External links
Official Website

Living people
Auckland Councillors
21st-century New Zealand women politicians
Auckland City Councillors
Year of birth missing (living people)